George Benjamin Hartzog Jr. (March 17, 1920 – June 27, 2008) was an American attorney and Director of the National Park Service.  Admitted to the bar in South Carolina in 1942, he became an attorney for the General Land Office (now the Bureau of Land Management) in the Department of the Interior in 1945, and six months later transferred to the National Park Service.

He moved to field assignments at Great Smoky Mountains and Rocky Mountain National Parks, and then made his name advancing the Gateway Arch project as superintendent of Gateway Arch National Park (then known as Jefferson National Expansion Memorial) from 1959 to 1962.  After briefly leaving the service Hartzog returned as associate director in 1963 with the promise of succeeding Conrad Wirth in January 1964.  As Director, he served as Stewart Udall’s right arm in achieving a remarkably productive legislative program that included 62 new parks, the National Historic Preservation Act of 1966, and the Bible amendment to the Alaska Native Claims Settlement Act that led to establishment of the Alaska parks. He ordered the Yosemite Firefall tradition discontinued in 1968. During his nine-year tenure, he enlarged the service's role in urban recreation, historic preservation, interpretation, and environmental education.

In 1969 NPS faced budget cuts. Harzog pioneered what became known as the Washington Monument Syndrome political tactic and closed all national parks two days a week. As public outcry grew, Congress restored the funding.

Hartzog was dismissed by President Nixon in December 1972. Afterwards, he practiced law in Washington, D.C.

George B. Hartzog died on June 27, 2008.

References

Further reading 
 
 McPhee, John/Pieces Of The Frame/Ranger

External links
George B. Hartzog Jr. Papers at Clemson University Special Collections Library

Directors of the National Park Service
1920 births
2008 deaths
People from Colleton County, South Carolina
South Carolina lawyers
20th-century American lawyers